Nelson Kerr Thompson (November 18, 1888 – September 20, 1968) was an American football, basketball and baseball coach. He served as the head football coach at Ursinus College from 1916 to 1917 at his alma mater, Slippery Rock University of Pennsylvania, from 1920 to 1945, compiling a career college football coaching record of 133–64–5. Thompson was the head basketball coach at Ursinus from 1916 to 1918 and Slippery Rock from 1919 to 1926 and from 1930 to 1946, tallying a career college basketball mark of 269–144.

References

External links
 

1888 births
1968 deaths
Basketball coaches from Pennsylvania
Slippery Rock baseball coaches
Slippery Rock football coaches
Slippery Rock men's basketball coaches
Ursinus Bears football coaches
Ursinus Bears football players
Ursinus Bears men's basketball coaches
Slippery Rock University of Pennsylvania alumni
University of Pittsburgh alumni
People from Butler County, Pennsylvania
Players of American football from Pennsylvania